Three Ragas is a 1956 LP album by Hindustani classical musician Ravi Shankar. It was digitally remastered and released in CD format by Angel Records in 2000. AllMusic reviewer Matthew Greenwald praised the performance of the raga Jog and described the album as an "excellent introduction to the medium of Indian music".

Track listing
"Raga Jog" – 28:21
"Raga Ahir Bhairav" – 15:36
"Raga Simhendra Madhyamam" – 10:57

References

1956 albums
Ravi Shankar albums
Angel Records albums
Pacific Jazz Records albums